The Greek Legion, officially the Light Jäger Foot Legion, was a Jäger infantry unit in the service of the Russian-controlled Septinsular Republic. It consisted of soldiers of Greek and Albanian origin and was led by Major-General Emmanouil Papadopoulos. It was active between 1805 and 1807, taking part in the War of the Third Coalition and the Russo-Turkish War (1806–1812).

Background
Following the defeat of the First French Republic in the Mediterranean campaign of 1798, in 1800 Russia and the Ottoman Empire established joint sovereignty over the former French-ruled Ionian Islands in the form of the Septinsular Republic. From 1802 on, Russian troops were stationed in the islands to safeguard Russian interests.

In 1803, in the Epirote mainland across the islands, the war between the Souliotes and the local semi independent Albanian Ottoman strongman  Ali Pasha of Ioannina ended in defeat for the former and the occupation of their homeland. Initially relocating to Parga, the Souliote refugees were forced to cross the sea to the Septinsular Republic in March 1804, after Ali Pasha threatened to attack the city to rid it of the Souliotes. Approximately 3,000 Souliotes settled in the Ionian Islands, mostly in Corfu and Paxi, where they were provided with farmland. The warlike Souliotes struggled to fit in their new environment, stealing cattle and firewood from local residents and lamenting the loss of their homeland; according to the local historian Panagiotis Chiotis, their sole preoccupation was "cleaning their weapons, playing the guitar, and singing of heroic deeds in Albanian". Anxious to expand its influence to the Greek mainland, Russia signed alliances with Himariot and Cham Albanian beys on 27 June. Souliote refugees were mobilized for an offensive, which was cut short when Ali Pasha learned of the Russian plans and an Ottoman naval squadron made an unexpected appearance off Corfu.

History
Apart from the Souliotes, the Septinsular Republic also became a haven for Greek klephts and armatoloi fleeing Ottoman rule in the rest of Greece. When French–Ottoman relations began to warm in 1805, the Russian General Roman von Anrep began raising Greek expatriate military formations for the defense of the Ionian Islands. The sole request of the Greeks was to be allowed to serve in their traditional uniforms and use their accustomed military tactics of irregular warfare, rather than be dragooned into Western-style regular units. This was granted, and the Souliotes joined the ranks of their countrymen from the Morea (Peloponnese), Acarnania and Himara in forming Jäger units.

The new corps was named Light Jäger Foot Legion, 2,760 strong and divided into six brigades of four hekatontarchies each. In addition, the Legion comprised a small artillery detachment manned with Moreot volunteers. Each brigade had its own flag with a distinctive colour, and featuring a cross with a crowned eagle in a laurel wreath in the center and the mottoes, taken from Isaiah 8:9–10, "God is with us" (ὁ Θεός μεθ' ἡμῶν) and "Huddle together, o nations, and be shattered" (γνῶτε ἔθνη καὶ ἡττᾶσθε). The legionaries wore their traditional dress, and took an oath to "serve the mighty Emperor of all the Russias and march against every enemy that the commander-in-chief of the Imperial Armies should command them to". The legion was initially commanded by Count Benckendorff, who was soon replaced by the Greek-born Major-General Emmanouil Papadopoulos. Among the hekatontarchs were such notable Souliote leaders as Kitsos Botsaris, Fotos Tzavelas and his brother Zygouris, the Zervas and Danglis brothers, Christoforos Perraivos, and even the son of the Bey of Mani, Pierros Grigorakis.

As part of the efforts to organize and train the Legion in modern warfare, in 1804 Papadopoulos published a military manual (Διδασκαλία στρατιωτική προς χρήσιν των Ελλήνων, "Military Teaching for the use of the Greeks"), followed the next year by the Legion's regulations (Ερμηνεία της συνισταμένης Λεγεώνος των Ηπειρωτο-Σουλιωτών και Χιμαρο-Πελοποννησίων, "Explanation of the combined Legion of Epirote-Souliots and Himariot-Peloponnesians"), where he exhorted its readers to remember that they are descendants of the ancient Greeks, to emulate the deeds of the celebrated Pyrrhus and Skanderbeg, and bring new glory to the Greek name.

In autumn 1805 the Greek Legion participated in the Anglo-Russian invasion of Naples, alongside 14,000 Russian and 10,000 British troops. The expedition was cut short, however, by Napoleon's decisive victory at the Battle of Austerlitz in December. In February 1806, the Anglo-Russians were forced to abandon the Italian mainland to the French. Fotos Tzavelas, Christos Kalogeros, and the future hero of the Greek Revolution, Nikitas Stamatelopoulos, particularly distinguished themselves during this campaign. In 1806 the Legion participated in operations in Dalmatia, where Papadopoulos commanded the Russian forces operating at the Bay of Kotor. On 19 September 1806, the legion captured Castel Nuovo after a seven-hour battle. During the unsuccessful Russian siege of Ragusa, the Legion confronted another Greek unit (augmented with Albanians and Slavs) in French service, the Chasseurs d'Orient under Nikolaos Papazoglou.

The Russo-Turkish War (1806–1812) broke out in December and the legion was brought back to the Ionian Islands, where it took part in the erection of new defense works. In March 1807, it was transferred to Lefkada, launching occasional raids on the areas opposite the island, after Ali Pasha massed troops at Plagia, assisted by French artillery under Papazoglou. During that time the unit reached its peak of 4,019 personnel. With the beginning of the Second Archipelago Expedition by Dmitry Senyavin, a portion of the Legion embarked for the Dardanelles. During a landing attempt at Tenedos, the hekatontarch Gogas Danglis was killed in action. In the aftermath of the Peace of Tilsit, Russia returned the Septinsular Republic to France and the legion was disbanded on 30 August 1807. The majority of the legionnaires were recruited into the French Albanian Regiment.

See also
 1st Regiment Greek Light Infantry
 Greek Battalion of Balaklava
 Albanian Regiment (France)

Notes

References

Further reading

 

Military units and formations established in 1804
Military units and formations disestablished in 1807
Russian military units and formations of the Napoleonic Wars
Septinsular Republic
Military history of Greece
Infantry units and formations
Souliotes